Bodoc may refer to:

Places
 Bodoc, Covasna, Romania
 Bodoc, Louisiana, United States

People
 Liliana Bodoc (1958-2018), Argentinian writer

See also
 Bodok (disambiguation)